Samtse Football Club was a football club from Samtse, Bhutan, based at the Samtse Dzongkhag Ground. They finished last in the inaugural season of Bhutan National League.

History
A team named Samtse competed in the 2001 season of the A-Division, where they finished in second place, qualifying from their group stage section, but losing 3–0 to Druk Star in the final. It is unclear whether this is the same team however, as the Bhutan Football Federation website states that the club were founded in 2012. There is no record of a team from Samtse competing in the A-Division again, so presumably the two teams are separate and are merely representative teams from Samtse.

The team competed in the inaugural season of the Bhutan National League, representing Samtse District. their first season of competition was not a successful one, as they lost all ten of their games, and finished bottom of the league, with a −31 goal difference. Even though there was no relegation from the National League, they did not return to competition the following season.

References

Football clubs in Bhutan
Samtse District